CCOM may refer to

 C-COM — Central Japan Commodity Exchange
 Central Conservatory of Music, in Beijing, China
 Center for Coastal & Ocean Mapping, a hydrographic research center at the University of New Hampshire
 CCOM - Chicago College of Osteopathic Medicine